A dynamic or  fientive verb is a verb that shows continued or progressive action on the part of the subject.  This is the opposite of a stative verb.

Overview
Actions denoted by dynamic verbs have duration. They occur over a span of time. This time span may or may not have a defined endpoint, and may or may not yet have occurred.  These distinctions lead to various forms related to tense and aspect. For example, a dynamic verb may be said to have a durative aspect if there is not a defined endpoint or a punctual aspect if there is a defined endpoint.

Examples of dynamic verbs in English are 'to run', 'to hit', 'to intervene', 'to savour' and 'to go'.

A striking feature of modern English is its limited use of the simple present tense of dynamic verbs. Generally, the  tense is required to express an action taking place in the present (I am going). The simple present usually refers to a habitual action (I go every day), a general rule (water runs downhill), a future action in some subordinate clauses (if I go) or the historical present (President signs bill). In other Germanic languages a progressive aspect of a dynamic verb is often not marked; for example, English 'I am going home' in German is simply Ich gehe nach Hause, using the present indicative.

A dynamic verb expresses a wide range of actions that may be physical (to run), mental (to ponder), or perceptual (to see), as opposed to a stative verb, which purely expresses a state in which there is no obvious action (to stand, believe, suppose etc.).

Examples

Mayrinax Atayal
Dynamic verbs of the Austronesian language Mayrinax Atayal, spoken in Taiwan, are marked morphologically by specific affixes. Stative verbs in Mayrinax Atayal are marked by the prefixes /ma-/ and /∅-/, whereas the dynamic verbs are marked by the affixes /m-/ and /-um-/, as well as /ma-/ and /∅-/.

Dynamic verbs
/m-astatail/ (jump)
/l-um-aŋuy/ (swim)
/ma-βahuq/ (wash)
/∅-palatuʔ/ (swing)

Passive verbs
/m-atɣaɣaaɣ/ (lie)
/k-um-antatali/ (kneel)
/ma-ʔoway/ (be tired)
/∅-maskaiyuŋ/ (be hungry)

References

Verb types
Syntax–semantics interface